The 6th Golden Melody Awards ceremony was held at the Sun Yat-sen Memorial Hall in Taipei on November 26, 1994.

References

External links
  6th Golden Melody Awards nominees
  

Golden Melody Awards
Golden Melody Awards
Golden Melody Awards
Golden Melody Awards